Clavaminate synthase (clavaminate synthase 2, clavaminic acid synthase) is an enzyme with systematic name deoxyamidinoproclavaminate,2-oxoglutarate:oxygen oxidoreductase (3-hydroxylating). This enzyme catalyses the following chemical reaction

(1) deoxyamidinoproclavaminate + 2-oxoglutarate + O2  amidinoproclavaminate + succinate + CO2
(2) proclavaminate + 2-oxoglutarate + O2  dihydroclavaminate + succinate + CO2 + H2O
(3) dihydroclavaminate + 2-oxoglutarate + O2  clavaminate + succinate + CO2 + H2O

Clavaminate synthase contains nonheme iron.

References

External links 
 

EC 1.14.11